Thelbridge is a village and civil parish in Devon, England. It is 5 miles NE of Morchard Road railway station and 8½ NNW of Crediton.

The local church, St David's has medieval origins but was completely rebuilt in 1872–1875. It is grade II* listed and is in a Gothic style.

The Thelbridge Cross Inn is a former coaching inn built of stone and cob and dates from the 1700s.

References

Villages in Mid Devon District